Shankbone can have a number of different meanings, including:
shankbone, an archaic term for the tibia
shankbone, alternative term for zroa, item at Passover seder

People
David Shankbone, American photographer and blogger